Terje Larsen (born 9 March 1951) is a former Swedish tennis player who was active in the 1970s.

Career
Larsen participated in the 1968 Wimbledon boys' singles event, losing in the quarterfinals to the Italian, Adriano Panatta.

Larsen made his debut in the main draw of a Grand Prix event at the 1973 Stockholm Open, losing in the first round to his compatriot Olle Palmer. Earlier in his career, during 1971, he lost 3–6, 6–2, 6–4 to Jan Písecký in the final of the Siracusa Open, a tournament not part of the circuit.

Larsen did not play in the singles main draw of a Grand Slam tournament, but at the 1974 Wimbledon Championships he played with fellow Swede, Ingrid Löfdahl Bentzer in the mixed doubles and lost in the first round.

References

External links 
 
 

1951 births
Living people
Swedish male tennis players